Future Soldier was a multi-nation military project by the United States and its allies launched in the late 1990s.

Set-up
Superiority to  enemy ground forces will be achieved by equipping the average ground-based combat soldier with an integrated set of high-technology uniforms and equipment. These will be linked to an array of real-time and archived battlefield information resources. Soldiers will require not only enhanced versions of existing equipment (rifle, pistol, knife, helmet, armour, clothing), but also new forms of equipment that will become possible as new types and combinations of technologies become viable for battlefield deployment.

Future Soldier Exhibition is an international exhibition mainly focused on the question of individual components of the "Dismounted Soldier" project, on the results of research, new technologies and materials, concepts and opportunities for international cooperation in the implementation of the integrated system of the soldier of the future and for the securing of the interoperability of its individual components in wartime and peacetime operations.

The last Future Soldier Exhibition took place in October 2012 in Prague. The event is organized under the aegis of the National Armaments Director within the Ministry of Defense of the Czech Republic.

Cancellation
In 2014 the Future soldier project was renamed by founder to Future Forces Exhibition and Conference and sold to the Future Forces Forum.

See also
Supersoldier
Future Soldier 2030 Initiative

References

Proposed military equipment
Future soldier programs